Flight MH370: The Mystery is a 2014 book by the American-born-British author Nigel Cawthorne concerning the disappearance of Malaysia Airlines Flight 370.

Synopsis
The book is critical of official accounts of the disappearance of Malaysia Airlines Flight 370, noting 'In a world where we can be tracked by our mobile phones, CCTV and spy cameras, things do not just disappear. Especially not a big thing like a jumbo jet'. The book questions alleged failure by governments and organisations to share information concerning Flight MH370. The author suggests a cover up has occurred because the United States Military shot down the plane during military exercises in the region.

Reception
The book was fiercely criticised in The Australian by David Free, who described it as an 'information gumbo' that 'reproduces the slapdash atmosphere of the worst kind of 24-hour news show' and advised readers 'Next time you're in one (a shop), buy any book other than this. I guarantee it won't be worse' while The Daily Telegraph reported some relatives of the victims were angered by the book

In a May 2014 segment of the Australian television program Today, co-host Karl Stefanovic also took issue with guest Cawthorne.“You write in the book: ‘They’ll never be sure, the families, what happened to their loved ones. Did they die painlessly unaware of their fate or did they die in terror in a flaming wreck crashing from the sky at the hands of a madman?’ Stefanovic characterized the book as "disgusting" and insensitive to the families. When asked "why would you write the book?", the author replied, “I’m afraid it’s what I do for a living."

References

2014 non-fiction books
Malaysia Airlines Flight 370
Books about conspiracy theories
Books by Nigel Cawthorne